Tegchö Dzö (Wylie: theg mchog mdzod) "Treasury of the Sublime Vehicle'" is one of the Seven Treasuries, a collection of seven works, some with auto-commentaries, by the Tibetan Buddhist philosopher and exegete Longchenpa.  The Tegchö Dzö is a commentary on the Seventeen Tantras of the Menngagde division of Atiyoga.

English discourse
An Outline of this text has been prepared by Germano of the University of Virginia and the project of comparing editions and producing a critical edition is underway.

Notes

Nyingma texts